Jackie Barnett Presents Jimmy Durante's Way of Life... with the Gordon Jenkins Orchestra and Chorus is a 1964 studio album by Jimmy Durante, arranged by Gordon Jenkins. It received a "Pop Special Merit" designation from Billboard upon its release, indicating "new releases of outstanding merit which deserve exposure and which could have commercial success within their respective categories of music".

Two songs from the album, "As Time Goes By" and "Make Someone Happy", were used in the soundtrack for the 1993 film Sleepless in Seattle.

Track listing

Personnel

Performance
Jimmy Durante - vocals
Gordon Jenkins - conductor, arranger

References

1964 albums
Jimmy Durante albums
Albums arranged by Gordon Jenkins
Warner Records albums
Albums conducted by Gordon Jenkins